Georg Johan Sverdrup (January 26, 1885 – November 4, 1951) was a professor of the history of religion.

Life and family
Sverdrup was born in Stockholm; he was the son of the bishop and politician Jakob Sverdrup and the brother of the Germanic philology professor Jakob Sverdrup and the zoologist Aslaug Sverdrup Sømme. He was the father of the historian Jakob Sverdrup, who directed the Norwegian Nobel Institute, and the mathematician Erling Sverdrup. He was the nephew of the theologian Georg Sverdrup.

After graduation, he worked as an instructor and school principal in Molde and at the Tanks Upper Secondary School in Bergen. After the Second World War, he received a professorship in religious studies at the University of Oslo as the successor to Wilhelm Schencke.

Bibliography
Fra gravskikker til dødstro i nordisk stenalder (From Burial Customs to Religious Conceptions of Death in the Nordic Stone Age). Oslo: Dybwad, 1927
Die Hausurnen und die Heiligkeit des Hauses (House Urns and the Sanctity of the House). Oslo: Dybwad, 1939
Da Norge ble kristnet : En religionssosiologisk studie (When Norway Became Christian: A Religious Sociological Study). Oslo: Norli, 1942

References

Academic staff of the University of Oslo
Schoolteachers from Bergen
1885 births
1951 deaths